Luis Fernán Bedoya Reyes (20 February 1919 – 18 March 2021) was a Peruvian Christian Democrat (PDC) and Christian People's Party (PPC) politician who served as the Mayor of Lima from 1964 to 1969.  He was also a Minister of Justice, member of the Peruvian Congress, and ran unsuccessfully for the Peruvian presidency two times.  He was the founder of the Christian People's Party (PPC). He was the father of Javier Bedoya, a former congressman and deputy, and Luis Bedoya de Vivanco, former mayor of Miraflores.

Biography 
He was born in Callao, on 20 February 1919, the son of Jacinto Bedoya Falconí and Luz Reyes de la Torre. He attended high school at the Nuestra Señora de Guadalupe School, where he stood out for his love of basketball.

He entered the Faculty of Letters of the Universidad Nacional Mayor de San Marcos with high qualifications, after which he went on to the Faculty of Law of the same university, a career in which he would graduate in 1942.

He married Laura de Vivanco, with whom he had seven children: Luis Guillermo (†), Javier Alonso, Laura, María del Rosario, Pedro Antonio, Marisol (†) and Roxana. His son, Javier Bedoya de Vivanco was a Congressman of the Republic from 2006 to 2016, and his grandson, Javier Bedoya Denegri, was Deputy Mayor of San Isidro from 2015 to 2018.

Retired from politics since 1999, he served as counselor of the Bedoya Law Firm (Estudio Bedoya Abogados). He turned 100 in February 2019, and died in March 2021 at the age of 102.

See also

 Christian People's Party (Peru)

References

1919 births
2021 deaths
Christian Democrat Party (Peru) politicians
Christian People's Party (Peru) politicians
Members of the Congress of the Republic of Peru
Men centenarians
National University of San Marcos alumni
People from Callao
Peruvian centenarians
Peruvian Ministers of Justice

Candidates for President of Peru
Mayors of Lima